Santiago Prim (born May 11, 1990 in Campana) is an Argentine footballer who currently plays as a midfielder for Acassuso.

Club career
Prim began his career in the youth ranks of storied Argentine side San Lorenzo. He made his professional debut on September 26, 2009 in a 3–2 victory over Tigre.

In early 2011 Prim went on trial with Columbus Crew of Major League Soccer. After a second trial stint, Prim signed with Columbus on April 27, 2011. Columbus released Prim on November 23, 2011.

In January 2012, he signed a new deal with the Uruguayan team Rampla Juniors.

References

External links
 
 
 

1990 births
Living people
Argentine footballers
Argentine expatriate footballers
San Lorenzo de Almagro footballers
Columbus Crew players
Rampla Juniors players
Club Atlético San Miguel footballers
Expatriate footballers in Uruguay
Expatriate soccer players in the United States
Association football midfielders
Argentine expatriate sportspeople in Uruguay
Argentine expatriate sportspeople in the United States